Chad E. Donella (born May 18, 1978) is a Canadian actor who has appeared in several movies and television shows.  He married Joni Bertin in 2007.

Life and career
He attended the Arts York Drama Program, in which he participated in such plays as Oedipus Rex, Waiting for Godot, and The Collected Works of Billy the Kid. He has performed at Toronto's Factory Theatre and the Markham Theatre. He also played bass for a time in a band called DAEVE. He has appeared in several movies such as Final Destination, The Long Kiss Goodnight, and Disturbing Behavior. In addition to his roles on film, he also obtained many parts on television, appearing in shows like The X-Files, Smallville, CSI: Crime Scene Investigation, NCIS, Monk and Lost. In many of his roles he has portrayed teenagers and young men undergoing a crisis. Donella had a role as Officer Gibson in Saw 3D, which was directed by Kevin Greutert.

Filmography

Television

Film

References

External links

1978 births
Living people
Canadian male film actors
Canadian male television actors
Male actors from Toronto